Skjetten is a town in Lillestrøm municipality, Viken county, Norway. It is located approximately 20 kilometres northeast of Oslo's city centre with a population of 10 000. Skjetten has five kindergartens, two primary schools and a secondary school in close proximity.

Notable people 

 Iver Bjerkestrand, skier
 Henrik Christiansen, swimmer
 Ingrid Hjelmseth, footballer

References

Villages in Akershus
Skedsmo